Côteaux Beauclair is a future station on line 11 of the Paris Métro. The station is situated on the communes of Rosny-sous-Bois and Noisy-le-Sec and slated to open in 2023. It is set to become Line 11's first and only station that's not underground, being located on a short viaduct.

Paris Métro line 11
Future Paris Métro stations
Railway stations scheduled to open in 2023